Quality Assurance International (QAI) is a U.S.-based international organic certification company that is authorized by the United States Department of Agriculture (USDA) as "a USDA-accredited certifying agent that operates globally to certify organic operations to National Organic Program standards."  It is a for-profit corporation, established in 1989, and headquartered in San Diego, California. It is one of the world's largest certifiers, operating in the United States, Canada, Latin America, European Union, and Japan. It is owned by public health and environmental organization NSF International.

Organic certification
QAI offers organic certification under the National Organic Program for agricultural producers, food processing facilities, integrated manufacturing operations, contract packing operations, traders, distributors, retailers, and ultimately consumers.

Gluten-free certification
QAI, in partnership with National Foundation for Celiac Awareness (NFCA), developed a science-based gluten-free certification program.

The stringent nature of the QAI certification protocols ensures prevention of contamination and co-mingling, critically important for those with allergies to gluten and gluten-intolerance. The QAI and NFCA "Gluten-Free" certification program requires companies to produce products at less than 10 parts per million (ppm) of gluten to receive certification.

The program includes:
 Product review
 Onsite inspection
 Testing to ensure compliance to 10ppm or less
 Ongoing compliance including random product testing

Personal care certification
QAI certifies personal care products to the National Organic Program guidelines. Those products not meeting the NOP guidelines can be certified to the NSF/ANSI 305 Standard for Personal Care Products "Contains Organic Ingredients".

Under this program, products with a minimum organic content of 70 percent (070) that meet the requirements can make the organic label and marketing claim of "Contains Organic Ingredients". These products can bear the unique NSF/ANSI 305 "Contains Organic Ingredients" mark. The Organic Trade Association considers certification to this standard a best practice. It is required by some retailers for personal care products that do not meet the National Organic Program standard for food.

Kosher certification
QAI, in partnership with Star-K, provides a joint kosher and organic auditing program. Through rabbinical supervision products can be certified to both kosher certification requirements and to the USDA National Organic Program standards for organic certification.

International organic certification
As an accredited certifying agent under the USDA's National Organic Program, QAI is also accredited by the USDA for ISO 65 compliance, the Japan Ministry of Agriculture Forestry for JAS (Japanese Agricultural Standard) compliance, and Le Conseil des appellations reservées et des termes valorisants (CARTV).

Food safety
QAI offers joint certification to the British Retail Consortium (BRC), Safe Quality Food (SQF) and FSSC 22000 global food safety standards, which is required by many retailers under the Global Food Safety Initiative (GFSI).

Environmental policy
QAI achieved ISO 14001 Environmental Management Systems accreditation in June 2010.

The International Organization for Standardization (ISO) 14001 standard provides guidance on how to manage the environmental aspects of an organization's activities, products and services more efficiently. ISO 14001 focuses on reducing the environmental footprint, pollution and waste produced by businesses, which is consistent with QAI's mission to help support organic agriculture and protect the environment.

ISO 14001 registration verifies that QAI has effective procedures in place to monitor and continuously improve its environmental performance. To obtain ISO 14001 registration, QAI reduced energy and raw material use; implemented a paperless documentation and billing management system; developed a recycling program for paper, plastic containers and bags, electronics, mercury-containing light bulbs and batteries; and instituted a composting program for coffee grounds, tea bags and fruit/vegetable food scraps.

Accreditations
QAI holds the following accreditations:
 United States Department of Agriculture (USDA)
 National Organic Program (NOP)
 ISO Guide 65
 International Organic Accreditation Service (IOAS)
 European Recognition Programme (EU)
 ISO Guide 65
 Canadian Organic Regime (COR)
 Conseil des appellations reservées et des termes valorisants (CARTV, Canada)
 KEMA
 ISO 14001
 JAS through our Japan-based, MAFF accredited partner EcoCert

Partnerships
QAI works with other leading food safety and quality organizations. As a result, QAI is able to provide additional services:
 NSF/ANSI 305 "Contains Organic Ingredients" Personal Care Products
 NaTrue Personal Care Certification
 British Retail Consortium (BRC), Safe Quality Foods (SQF), FSSC 22000 Certification
 HACCP (Hazard analysis critical control point)
 Star-K Kosher Certification
 IBD Eco-Social Certification
 Dietary Supplement GMP and Certification
 Sustainability Claims Verification
 Non-GMO Project Certification

Community and industry advocacy
QAI sponsors the Earth Day Fair in San Diego to help educate the community on the benefits of "going organic". QAI is also active in the San Diego school district, serving on the board of directors for the Terra Nova Academy, a special educational curriculum engaging at-risk secondary education students in urban San Diego on careers in food and environmental science. NSF team members also judge science fairs and mentor teachers, helping the community cultivate a commitment to the environment at all ages and stages of life.

QAI is also active in the Organic Trade Association (OTA) to help protect and promote organic practices. QAI Senior Vice President Joe Smillie has served as OTA president and as a member of the board of directors. QAI President Kristen Holt currently serves on the board of directors as treasurer.

Past controversy
In July 2008, it was reported that organic powdered ginger that had been certified by QAI, was found when tested to be contaminated with the banned pesticide Aldicarb. The organic ginger from which the QAI certified organic powdered ginger originated had been certified organic by two other USDA accredited certifying agents in China. Under Chinese law, foreigners may not inspect Chinese farms.

See also

 Organic farming
 Organic food
 Soil Association (United Kingdom organic certification)
 List of organic food topics

References

External links 
 Homepage of Quality Assurance International
 USDA National Organic Program
 The Organic Trade Association (OTA)

Companies based in San Diego
Companies established in 1989
Organic food certification organizations
Privately held companies based in California
Kosher food certification organizations
Gluten-free diet
Agricultural organizations based in the United States